was a Japanese aikido teacher holding the rank of 8th dan shihan from the Aikikai.

Life and career
Nishio was born in Aomori Prefecture of Japan in 1927. He joined Aikikai Hombu Dojo in 1951 and began to teach around 1955. Before aikido he studied judo (6th Dan Kodokan Judo), karate (5th Dan Shindō jinen-ryū), iaido (7th Dan Nihon Zenkoku Iaido Renmei) and jōdō and also Shintō Musō-ryū jōjutsu and Hōzōin-ryū sōjutsu. Skills gained from them he managed to smoothly merge into his own specific aikido style where all techniques can be performed with the wooden sword bokken in hand as well as without weapons, and his weapon systems has few similarities to the more common system that derives from Morihiro Saito. He held the title of an Aikikai shihan and also created a new school of Iaido with forms from aikido, called Aiki Toho Iaido or Nishio-ryu Iai. In 2003 Nishio received the Budo Kyoryusho award from Japanese Budo Federation for his lifetime contribution to development and worldwide propagation of aikido. He died in March 2005 aged 77.

External links

 Nishikaze Aikido Society of America - Official Nishio Organization in the U.S.
 Yufukan Ukraine - Nishio Budo Centre, Official Nishio Organization in Ukraine
 Bohemia Aikikai - Organization for Nishio in Czech Republic

1927 births
2005 deaths
Japanese aikidoka